Al-Hadaf, is a Palestinian weekly political and cultural magazine published in Lebanon.

History and profile
Al Hadaf was founded in Beirut in 1969 by Ghassan Kanafani as the political mouthpiece of the Popular Front for the Liberation of Palestine (PFLP), espousing a Marxist–Leninist version of pan-Arab Palestinian nationalism. Kanafani also served as the editor-in-chief of the weekly. Deputy editor was Bassam Abu Sharif. In 1972, Kanafani was killed by a car bomb, but Al Hadaf remains in publication. The magazine is based in Beirut.

See also
 List of magazines in Lebanon

References

External links
Al-Hadaf homepage

1969 establishments in Lebanon
Arabic-language magazines
Cultural magazines
Magazines established in 1969
Magazines published in Beirut
Marxist magazines
Pan-Arabist media
Weekly magazines published in Lebanon